A Scholar's Feast, also translated as Scholar's Feast or Feast for Scholars, was a pseudo-historical work written by Pawo Tsuglag Threngwa, the 2nd Nenang Pawo of the Karma Kagyu in Tibet.

References

16th-century books
History of Tibet
Tibetan literature
Tibetan Buddhist treatises